Claudia Draxl is a physicist. She is a full professor at the Humboldt University of Berlin in theoretical condensed-matter physics.

Life 
From 1978 to 1983, Draxl studied mathematics and physics at the University of Graz. She received her doctorate at the University of Graz in theoretical physics in 1987. She finished her habilitation at University of Graz in 1996. From 1996 to 1997, she was a lecturer at the University of Graz. From 1997 to 1998, she was an associate professor at the University of Graz. She was the director of the Institute of Theoretical Physics at the University of Graz from 1999 to 2001, and the deputy director of the very same institute from 2001 to 2004. From 2005 to 2011, she was a university professor at the University of Leoben and had the chair for Atomistic Modelling and Design of Materials. Since 2011, she is a university professor at the Humboldt University of Berlin and has the chair of theoretical condensed-matter physics.

Research 
Draxl's research focuses on condensed-matter theory. Her main research topics are:

Ab initio calculation of the properties of solids
 Density functional theory
 Many-body theory
 Theoretical spectroscopy
 Electron-phonon coupling
 Organic and inorganic semiconductors
 Hybrid materials & nanostructures
 Superconductivity

Awards 
Draxl has received several awards:

Ludwig Boltzmann Prize from the Austrian Physical Society (OePG) in 1995
Honorary doctorate from the Faculty of Science and Technology at Uppsala University, Sweden, in 2000
 Research award from the Federal State of Styria, Austria, in 2008
 Fellow of the American Physical Society in 2011
 Einstein Professor at the Humboldt-Universität zu Berlin in 2013
 Paracelsusring by the City of Villach in 2013
 Caroline von Humboldt Professorship in 2014
 Appointment as a Max Planck Fellow in 2014
 Corresponding member of the Austrian Academy of Sciences abroad in 2018

Selected publications

References 

Living people
Austrian women physicists
Year of birth missing (living people)
20th-century Austrian physicists
20th-century Austrian women scientists
21st-century Austrian physicists
21st-century Austrian women scientists
University of Graz alumni
Academic staff of the University of Graz
Academic staff of the University of Leoben
Academic staff of the Humboldt University of Berlin
Members of the Austrian Academy of Sciences
Fellows of the American Physical Society